Events in the year 1896 in Germany.

Incumbents

National level
 Kaiser – Wilhelm II
 Chancellor – Chlodwig, Prince of Hohenlohe-Schillingsfürst

State level

Kingdoms
 King of Bavaria – Otto of Bavaria
 King of Prussia – Kaiser Wilhelm II
 King of Saxony – Albert of Saxony
 King of Württemberg – William II of Württemberg

Grand Duchies
 Grand Duke of Baden – Frederick I
 Grand Duke of Hesse – Ernest Louis
 Grand Duke of Mecklenburg-Schwerin – Frederick Francis III
 Grand Duke of Mecklenburg-Strelitz – Frederick William
 Grand Duke of Oldenburg – Peter II
 Grand Duke of Saxe-Weimar-Eisenach – Charles Alexander

Principalities
 Schaumburg-Lippe – George, Prince of Schaumburg-Lippe
 Schwarzburg-Rudolstadt – Günther Victor, Prince of Schwarzburg-Rudolstadt
 Schwarzburg-Sondershausen – Karl Günther, Prince of Schwarzburg-Sondershausen
 Principality of Lippe – Alexander, Prince of Lippe (with Prince Adolf of Schaumburg-Lippe as regent)
 Reuss Elder Line – Heinrich XXII, Prince Reuss of Greiz
 Reuss Younger Line – Heinrich XIV, Prince Reuss Younger Line
 Waldeck and Pyrmont – Friedrich, Prince of Waldeck and Pyrmont

Duchies
 Duke of Anhalt – Frederick I, Duke of Anhalt
 Duke of Brunswick – Prince Albert of Prussia (regent)
 Duke of Saxe-Altenburg – Ernst I, Duke of Saxe-Altenburg
 Duke of Saxe-Coburg and Gotha – Alfred, Duke of Saxe-Coburg and Gotha
 Duke of Saxe-Meiningen – Georg II, Duke of Saxe-Meiningen

Colonial Governors
 Cameroon (Kamerun) – Theodor Seitz (2nd term)
 German East Africa (Deutsch-Ostafrika) – Hermann Wissmann to 3 December, then Eduard von Liebert
 German New Guinea (Deutsch-Neuguinea) – Hugo Rüdiger to 17 August, then from 22 September Curt von Hagen (both Landeshauptleute of the German New Guinea Company)
 German South-West Africa (Deutsch-Südwestafrika) – Theodor Leutwein (Landeshauptleute)
 Togoland – August Köhler (Landeshauptleute)

Events

 12 April – German football club Hannover 96 is founded.
 1 June – Institut für Serumforschung und Serumprüfung in Berlin is opened.

Undated
 Gottlieb Daimler produces the first gasoline truck.
 Emperor William Monument in Porta Westfalica is completed.
 German physicist Wilhelm Wien derives the Wien approximation.

Births
 11 January – Heinrich Stuhlfauth, German football player and goalkeeper (died 1966)
 4 February – Friedrich Hund, German physicist (died 1997)
 9 February – Erich Vagts, German politician (died 1980)
 14 February – Werner Richard Heymann, German film composer (died 1961)
 23 February – Herbert Weichmann, German politician (died 1983)
 25 February – Ida Noddack, German chemist (died 1978)
 2 March – Caesar von Hofacker, German colonel (died 1944)
 22 March – Karl Dannemann, German actor (died 1945)
 1 April – Wilhelm Sauter, German painter (died 1948)
 13 May – Josias, Hereditary Prince of Waldeck and Pyrmont (died 1967)
 20 May – Paul Kemp, German actor (died 1953)
 9 June – Karl Sack, German jurist (died 1945)
 16 July – Otmar Freiherr von Verschuer, German physician (died 1969)
 23 July – Reinhold Frank, German lawyer (died 1945)
 19 August – Josef Kammhuber, German general (died 1986)
 23 August – Hubert von Meyerinck, German actor (died 1971)
 15 September – Theodor Haubach, German journalist (died 1945)
 14 October – Wolf-Heinrich Graf von Helldorff, German police officer and politician (died 1944)
 18 October – Friedrich Hollaender, German film composer and author (died 1976)
 30 October – Roma Bahn, German actress (died 1975)
 9 November – Hellmut von der Chevallerie, German general (died 1965)
 28 November – Otto Graf, German actor (died 1977)
 3 December – Carlo Schmid, German politician (died 1979)
 18 December – Hans Otto Erdmann, German officer (died 1944)
 27 December – Carl Zuckmayer, German writer and playwright (died 1977)
 31 December – Carl Ludwig Siegel, German mathematician (died 1981)

Deaths
 29 February – Albrecht von Stosch, German admiral (born 1818)
 28 April – Heinrich von Treitschke, German historian (born 1834)
 18 May – Otto von Camphausen, German politician (born 1812)
 20 May – Clara Schumann, German musician and composer (born 1819)
 2 June – Friedrich Gerhard Rohlfs, German geographer, explorer and author (born 1831)
 11 July – Ernst Curtius, German archaeologist and historian (born 1814)
 13 July – August Kekulé, German chemist (born 1829)
 10 August – Otto Lilienthal, German pioneer of aviation (born 1848)
 13 August – Philipp Ludwig von Seidel, German mathematician (born 1821)
 22 October – Christian Roos, German bishop of Roman-Catholic Church (born 1826)
 3 November – Eugen Baumann, German chemist (born 1846)
 19 November – Otto Graf zu Stolberg-Wernigerode, German politician (born 1837)
 17 December – Paul Beiersdorf, German pharmacist (born 1836)

References

 
Years of the 19th century in Germany
Germany
Germany
[[Category:1890s in Germany